is an survival horror, adventure, and dōjin soft video game series originally created by Makoto Kedōin and developed by Team GrisGris. The first game in the series was developed using the RPG Maker software version RPG Tsukūru Dante 98 and released on April 22, 1996 for the PC-9801. It was followed by three remakes: Corpse Party: NewChapter, which was released incomplete for mobile phones from October 3, 2006 to December 26, 2007, Corpse Party: Blood Covered, which was released for Microsoft Windows from March 8, 2008 to July 28, 2011, and Corpse Party: Blood Covered ...Repeated Fear, which was released for the PlayStation Portable on August 12, 2010, and iOS on February 9, 2012. The game was released in North America and Europe by Marvelous USA under the title Corpse Party. Marvelous USA planned to release a localized version Corpse Party Blood Covered for PC in North America in 2015, but the title was delayed until 2016. A 3DS version of the game, titled Corpse Party Blood Covered: ...Repeated Fear was released in Japan on July 30, 2015, and contains a new extra chapter not present in the PSP and iOS version.

The PSP game was followed by a sequel, Corpse Party: Book of Shadows, which was released for the PSP on September 1, 2011, in Japan, and on January 15, 2013, in North America. A spin-off game, Corpse Party: Sweet Sachiko's Hysteric Birthday Bash, was released for the PSP in Japan on August 2, 2012, and was released for Windows worldwide on April 10, 2019. A direct sequel of Corpse Party: Book of Shadows, called Corpse Party: Blood Drive, was released in Japan on July 24, 2014, on PlayStation Vita, and was released in North America by XSeed Games on October 13, 2015, and on October 20, 2015, in Europe.

Another sequel titled Corpse Party 2: Dead Patient was created for the PC by GrindHouse, a dōjin circle founded by members affiliated with Team GrisGris. It is planned to be released episodically, with the first chapter released on May 29, 2013.

The series has spawned several manga works, an anime OVA series, drama CDs, theme park attractions, and two live action films.

Setting and plot
The plot of the original Corpse Party game concerns a group of Japanese high school students, celebrating their school's culture festival. The group are telling ghost stories when a sudden earthquake transports them to a dilapidated schoolhouse in an alternate dimension. The school is haunted by the ghosts of people who have been trapped there. The main playable character is Satoshi Mochida, a kind-hearted high school student who is teased by his classmates for his cowardly nature. Three of the other characters are students from Satoshi's class: Naomi Nakashima, Satoshi's childhood friend; Yoshiki Kishinuma, an intimidating yet good-natured student; and Ayumi Shinozaki, the class representative. Rounding out the group is Yuka Mochida, Satoshi's younger sister. The game's antagonist is the ghost of a former student, a girl in a red dress who seeks vengeance for her death at the hands of a teacher many years prior.

Blood Covered and Repeated Fear

Corpse Party: NewChapter remake was released for mobile phones in four chapters from October 3, 2006 to December 26, 2007. It was discontinued before Chapter 5 was released. It contained the same plot additions as the later Blood Covered, but had much smaller maps.

Blood Covered, released for PC in five chapters (first two released together) from March 8, 2008 to July 28, 2011, is an enhanced remake and port of the 1996 Corpse Party. It includes more characters, larger maps, updated graphics, and a cast of amateur voice actors. It was followed on August 12, 2010 by another enhanced remake, Blood Covered: Repeated Fear, which was released internationally as Corpse Party, which features updated art and the addition of professional voice actors.

The remake thoroughly expands the plot and setting of the original game. Here, the haunted schoolhouse is named , a fictional Fujisawa elementary school that was torn down following the murders and disappearances of several of its staff and students. In modern-day Japan, the main characters' high school, has been built over the elementary school site. The students are transported to Heavenly Host after performing a charm called , which would supposedly allow them to remain friends for eternity.

In addition to the five protagonists of the original game, Blood Covered introduces four characters to the playable cast: Seiko Shinohara, Naomi's best friend; Mayu Suzumoto, a popular student due to transfer out of Kisaragi; Sakutaro Morishige, Mayu's best friend; and Yui Shishido, the class's homeroom teacher. Blood Covered also includes several characters from other schools who are also trapped inside Heavenly Host and affect the story. Two notable characters are Naho Saenoki, a selfish but helpful paranormalist from  who discovered the Sachiko Ever After charm and came to investigate Heavenly Host; and Yuuya Kizami, a sadistic student from  who accompanies Yuka as she is separated from her brother. The red ghost is re-envisioned as a little girl named Sachiko Shinozaki who kills the students of Heavenly Host in anger over her and her mother's murder.

Another Child
Corpse Party: Another Child is a spin-off manga that takes place during the events of Corpse Party. With their school, shutting down for good, the students of a small town were heading for different directions in life, not until they decide to perform the "Sachiko Ever After" charm swallowing the entire class to Heavenly Host Elementary, along with a mysterious girl's spirit. In order to get out, they must track and get rid of the spirit.

Book of Shadows

A sequel to Blood Covered, Book of Shadows features a series of nonlinear chapters that add new twists and backgrounds for various characters and details important to the storyline. The game mostly takes place during the same time the first game did, continuing from one of the "wrong ends" in Corpse Party, where Sachiko sends the Kisaragi Academy students back in time. For this purpose, she erases their memories except for Satoshi's. He fails to dissuade his classmates from performing the charm, but he joins them, not wanting to let them go alone, sending them on alternative course of actions and encountering several supporting victims in Heavenly Host.

The game's epilogue, Blood Drive, serves as the set up to the eponymous sequel. Two weeks after escaping Heavenly Host, Ayumi and Naomi go to investigate the Shinozaki estate, Sachiko's birthplace, believing there is hope in reviving their dead friends since Naho and Kou Kibiki's existences were not erased like the other victims. At the estate, Ayumi discovers that she is of the same lineage as Sachiko. Hearing an eerie voice, Ayumi uncovers a magical tome known as the Book of Shadows. Ayumi and Naomi perform a resurrection spell for Mayu, but fail. As compensation for using black magic, the book unleashes its rage upon Ayumi until her older sister Hinoe Shinozaki rushes in and saves Ayumi, at the cost of her own life.

Sweet Sachiko's Hysteric Birthday Bash
On the day of Sachiko's birth and death, the curse on her weakens and she gets 24 hours to celebrate her birthday as someone closer to the girl she was before her death. She uses the timeloops as established in Corpse Party: Book of Shadows to force all survivors at that point to participate in activities she has set up. Given it is either that or die horribly again, something all are aware that they have already experienced but cannot remember in full, they go along with her demands. The game features almost all characters from the previous games and some new ones. While a pseudo-horror spin-off at best, it is part of the storyline, setting up a few details to prepare for Corpse Party: Blood Drive.

As with Corpse Party: Book of Shadows, there is only one extra chapter. This extra chapter takes place during the previous game and is more conventional horror. It tells of Yoshiki's and Ayumi's encounter with four students from Sugatani Senior High School, notably Azusa Takai.

Blood Drive
Corpse Party: Blood Drive is the direct sequel to Corpse Party: Book of Shadows, and is the first game featuring settings and characters rendered in 3D. The game was released for the Sony PlayStation Vita in Japan in July 2014 by 5pb. The characters are depicted in 3D chibi style, however traditional CG artwork appears during cutscenes, illustrated by Sakuya Kamishiro.

Continuing from the prologue included in Book of Shadows, Naomi manages to save Ayumi and takes her to a hospital. The Shinozaki estate and tome subsequently vanish without a trace. Ayumi had been severely ill for her misuse of the Book of Shadows' black magic. In the hospital, a woman claiming to be a spiritual associate of Hinoe's visits Ayumi. This woman belongs to the Wiccan Institute, an organization that worships spirits. She tells her Hinoe's last wish, which is to regain the Book of Shadows or the world will fall into the abyss. This is partially a lie, as the woman is under threat of other organizations to get Ayumi to find the book, which they wish to use for their own gain.

After being discharged from the hospital two months later, Ayumi returns to Kisaragi Academy where Satoshi and friends give her a warm welcome. However, the absence of their dead friends is a constant reminder of their inevitable reality. A new teacher's assistant, Kuon Niwa, supervises their homeroom. Later, on her way home, a black hooded boy approaches Ayumi and tells her, "If you reclaim the Book of Shadows and use it at Heavenly Host, those who have died there will be revived." Ayumi pledges that she will once more take back the Book of Shadows. The trail leads into the previous residence of Makina Shinozaki. To make matters worse, Heavenly Host's curse is expanded by the "new Sachiko", later named Sachi.

2: Dead Patient
The game Corpse Party 2: Dead Patient takes place five years after the events of Corpse Party Heavenly Host Arc, implied to be the consequences of the Book of Shadows' powers starting to bring about the end of the world by allowing the spirit realm and real world to start to converge together. The setting takes place at  fallen into a dark abyss. Patient records and clinical charts are scattered all over the hospital, with zombies and a bizarre SWAT team roaming through the hallways. An amnesiac girl, Ayame Itou, wakes up on an operating table and encounters the dark happenings around her.

Development
The first game in the series was developed using the RPG Maker version RPG Tsukūru Dante 98 software and released in 1996 for the PC-9801.

Dummy head mics were utilized for Blood Covered, Book of Shadows, and Blood Drive to provide perceived three dimensional sound.

Media listing

Music
The opening for Corpse Party Blood Covered: ...Repeated Fear is "Shangri-La" by Asami Imai, and the ending for Blood Covered is "Confutatis no Inori" by Artery Vein (Imai & Eri Kitamura). An insert song, "Yami ni Nureta Catastrophe", also sung by Artery Vein, plays at the end of the game.

The opening theme for Corpse Party: Book of Shadows is "Hana no Saku Basho" by Imai, and the ending is "Pandora no Yoru", by Artery Vein.

The opening theme for Corpse Party: Sweet Sachiko's Hysteric Birthday Bash is called "Limited Love" by Imai, and the ending theme is "Tsukigen" by ARTERY VEIN. An insert song, "Hanabi", sung by Yumi Hara, plays at the final scene where Sachiko's birthday has ended and she seemed to have only a brief memory of it, before screaming in agony and reverting to her malicious self.

In Corpse Party: Blood Drive, there are two openings; the first one being "In the Rain", by Hara, and the second being "Keshin" by Imai, which plays at Chapter 7 after Ayumi's retrieval of the Book of Shadows. The ending is "Translucent Days" by ARTERY VEIN.

Critical reception

Although the series has received mixed to positive reviews as a whole, it is regarded as a "cult favorite" in Japan with a dedicated fan following. Famitsu gave Corpse Party: Blood Drive a score of 29/40.

Adaptations
The video game series has been adapted into four manga series: Corpse Party: Blood Covered, published by Square Enix; Corpse Party: Musume and Corpse Party: Book of Shadows, published by Media Factory; and Corpse Party: Another Child, published by Mag Garden. The manga series has sold over 1million copies, as of May 2015.

One original video animation (OVA), Corpse Party: Missing Footage, was released on August 2, 2012. Another OVA consisting of four episodes titled Corpse Party: Tortured Souls, was released on July 24, 2013, and later licensed by Section23 Films.
A movie adaptation was also made, which was released on August 1, 2015, while a film adaptation of Corpse Party: Book of Shadows was released on June 30, 2016.

China ban
On June 12, 2015, the Chinese Ministry of Culture listed Corpse Party among 38 anime and manga titles banned in Mainland China.

Notes

References

External links

 Official English website
 Official website (manga) 

Corpse Party
2008 manga
Video games set in 2008
2010 manga
2012 anime OVAs
Adventure games
Asread
Video games about spirit possession
Gangan Comics manga
Horror anime and manga
Horror video games
IOS games
Mag Garden manga
Media Factory manga
Mass media franchises
Android (operating system) games
Nintendo 3DS eShop games
Nintendo 3DS games
Nintendo Switch games
PlayStation 4 games
PlayStation Portable games
PlayStation Vita games
Mystery video games
Seinen manga
Shōnen manga
Video game franchises introduced in 1996
Video game franchises
Video games about birthdays
Video games about death
Video games about ghosts
Video games about mental health
Video games developed in Japan
Video games featuring female protagonists
Windows games
Works banned in China